WeBank may refer to:

WeBank (China), a Chinese private online bank launched by Tencent
WeBank (Italy), a commercial bank in Milan, Italy